The R440 road is a regional road in Ireland linking Birr, County Offaly and Mountrath, County Laois. It passes through the village of Kinnity, Co. Offaly and from there climbs to the watershed of the Slieve Bloom Mountains north of Stillbrook Hill, crossing at an elevation of  into County Laois on the plateau and descending to Mountrath. 

See also
Roads in Ireland
National primary road
National secondary road

References
Roads Act 1993 (Classification of Regional Roads) Order 2006 – Department of Transport

Regional roads in the Republic of Ireland
Roads in County Laois
Roads in County Offaly